Vigeland may refer to:

Places
Vigeland, Norway, the administrative centre of Lindesnes municipality in Vest-Agder, Norway
Vigeland installation, a complex of sculptures inside Frogner Park in Oslo, Norway
Vigeland Museum, a museum in Oslo, Norway

People
Carl Vigeland (born 1947), an American writer and lecturer
Daniel Vigeland (1847–1927), a Norwegian farmer and politician for the Liberal Party
Emanuel Vigeland (1875–1948), a Norwegian artist
Gustav Vigeland (1869–1943), a Norwegian sculptor
Maria Vigeland (1903-1983), a Norwegian painter and sculptor
 Tone Vigeland (1938-), Norwegian gold/silversmith and jewelry designer
Nils Vigeland (born 1950), an American composer and pianist